Big Synergy Media Limited is a television production company headed by chief executive officer Rajiv Bakshi. It started as one of the country's first few independent television outfits in 1988. BIG Synergy is an acknowledged leader in factual entertainment in India. It has produced some of India's most popular and critically acclaimed factual entertainment shows.

The company is famous for producing Kaun Banega Crorepati, India's biggest television quiz show, hosted by Amitabh Bachchan.

History
Founded in 1988, the production house has been allied with Reliance MediaWorks since 2007. Reliance Mediaworks is a division of the BIG Entertainment conglomerate of the Anil Dhirubhai Ambani Group. In 2016, the company formed a strategic alliance with Phantom Films to foray into the scripted segment of TV and digital media. Working out of Mumbai, Delhi, Chennai, Hyderabad, Trivandrum, Bangalore and Kolkata, BIG Synergy has produced TV shows in nine languages.

Over the years, BIG Synergy has delivered original non-fiction shows such as Quiz Time, India Quiz, A Question of Answers, Manch Masala, Style Today, Eureka, 3-2-1, Mum Tum aur Hum, Bollywood Ka Boss, Khelo Jeeto Jiyo and Sports Ka Superstar, as well as international formats such as Mastermind, University Challenge, Kamzor Kadi Kaun, India's Child Genius, Bluffmaster, Heartbeat, Kya Aap Paanchvi Pass Se Tez Hain, 10 Ka Dum, India's Got Talent, Aap Ki Kachehri, Sach Ka Saamna and Kaun Banega Crorepati, along with India's Best Jobs for the Discovery Channel and The GoodHomes Show for TLC.

BIG Synergy is expanding its offerings into the fiction segment of TV and digital media with popular web-series like Yay kay hua Bro with Voot, Kaushiki with VuClip, Bose: Dead/Alive with ALT Balaji, and a few shows under development with Amazon and Netflix.

New shows (2017–2018)

 The GoodHomes Show with WWM, to be aired on TLC; hosted by Ronita Italia Dhanu
 Kaushiki with VuClip, Viu, directed by Suparn Verma; creative producer Namit Sharma; starring Rannvijay Singh
 Bose: Dead/Alive with Alt Digital Media Entertainment; directed by Pulkit and Hansal Mehta; starring Rajkumar Rao; produced By Ekta Kapoor
 Yo kay Hua Bro with Voot Originals; creative producer Namit Sharma; starring Shamita Shetty, Aparshakti Khurana
 India's Best Jobs-Season 1 & 2 with Discovery Channel, creative producer Namit Sharma; host Meiyang Chang
 News Wiz Quiz Show with India Today, hosted by Rajdeep Sardesai
 People's Choice in Malayalam language, aired on Asianet Channel

Shows

Hindi

Web series

Fiction shows

Non-fiction shows

Other languages

References

Companies based in Mumbai
Mass media companies established in 1988
Television production companies of India
Entertainment companies of India
Reliance Entertainment subsidiaries
Indian companies established in 1988
1988 establishments in Maharashtra